Dimensions of Dialogue is a 1983 Czechoslovak animated short film directed by Jan Švankmajer. It is 14 minutes long and created with stop motion.

Plot
The animation is divided into three sections. "Eternal conversation" (Dialog věčný) shows Arcimboldo-like heads gradually reducing each other to bland copies; "Passionate discourse" (Dialog vášnivý) shows a clay man and woman who dissolve into one another sexually, then quarrel and reduce themselves to a frenzied, boiling pulp; and "Exhaustive discussion" (Dialog vyčerpávající) consists of two elderly clay heads who extrude various objects on their tongues (toothbrush and toothpaste; shoe and shoelaces, etc.) and intertwine them in various combinations.

Reception
Terry Gilliam selected the film as one of the ten best animated films of all time.

Awards
Annecy International Animated Film Festival 1983 – Won Grand Prix
Berlin International Film Festival 1983 – Won Golden Bear for Best Short Film, C.I.D.A.L.C. Award (Honorable Mention)

References

External links

Dimensions of Dialogue - Tativille

1983 films
1980s animated short films
Czechoslovak animated short films
Films directed by Jan Švankmajer
Stop-motion animated short films
Czech animated short films
Surrealist films
Film censorship in the Czech Republic
Film controversies in the Czech Republic